Zhang Tengyue (Chinese: 张腾岳; Pinyin: Zhāng Téngyuè, born November 8, 1975) is a Chinese TV host of CCTV-10's 9 Science.

Biography
Zhang Tengyue received his A.B. degree from Beijing Broadcasting Institute.  After graduation, he joined China Central Television and became the popular host of Approaching Science.

Notes

External links
 Zhang's homepage at CCTV-10

1975 births
Living people
Chinese television presenters